Creseis is a genus of gastropods belonging to the family Creseidae.

The genus has cosmopolitan distribution.

Species:

Creseis acicula 
Creseis antoni 
Creseis aquensis 
Creseis berthae 
Creseis conica 
Creseis corpulenta 
Creseis curta 
Creseis cylindrica 
Creseis kishimaensis 
Creseis maxima 
Creseis monotis 
Creseis phaeostoma 
Creseis roesti 
Creseis simplex 
Creseis spina 
Creseis tugurii 
Creseis virgula

References

Gastropods